Adam Long is an American actor, screenwriter, and director based in London, England, as well as a founding member of The Reduced Shakespeare Company. From 1987 to 2003  he co-wrote and performed "The Complete Works of William Shakespeare (abridged)"  "The Complete History of America (abridged)", "The Reduced Shakespeare Radio Show" for the BBC World Service, and "The Ring Reduced", a 30 minute condensation of Wagner's Ring Cycle for Channel 4 television.

In 1996, Long directed the Reduced Shakespeare Company's London production of "The Complete Works of William Shakespeare (Abridged)" which was nominated for an Olivier Award for Best Comedy in 1997, and ran for 9 years at the Criterion Theatre in Piccadilly Circus. Stage production licensing in the U S and Canada is by Broadway Play Publishing Inc.

Long left The Reduced Shakespeare Company in 2003. He then co-wrote and starred in The Barn, an independent feature film which won a British Independent Film Award in 2004 - The Raindance Award, for the film which best embodies the spirit of independent filmmaking. In 2006, he wrote and performed Star Wars Shortened  for Sky Movies, and The Condensed History of Tony Blair for BBC Radio 4. In 2007 he wrote and directed Dickens Unplugged, which premiered at the Edinburgh Fringe Festival.  The show was brought to Guildford in February, 2007, and made its West End debut on May 23, 2008 at the Comedy Theatre. It has been published as Dickens (abridged) by Broadway Play Publishing Inc. In 2008, he wrote and performed The Condensed History of Political Parties for BBC Radio 4, and in 2009 The Condensed History of George W Bush, also for BBC Radio 4.

From 2008 to the present, Adam has worked extensively in animation, writing for Netflix, CBBC, CBeebies, Disney, Nickelodeon, and Sprout. He is the voice of Mr. Small in seasons 2 to 6 of the BAFTA and Emmy Award-winning animated series The Amazing World of Gumball. He has also provided voices for Elliott from Earth.

Adam Long currently resides in London.

References

External links 

British Independent Film Awards 2004
Star Wars Shortened on YouTube 
The Condensed History of Tony Blair, BBC Radio Four 
The Condensed History of Political Parties, BBC Radio Four 
The Condensed History of George W Bush, BBC Radio Four 
Dickens Unplugged 

American male stage actors
Place of birth missing (living people)
Year of birth missing (living people)
American dramatists and playwrights
Living people